Malaysia competed at the 2020 Winter Youth Olympics in Lausanne, Switzerland from 9 to 22 January 2020.

Malaysia's team consisted of two short track speed skaters (one boy and one girl), marking the country's sport debut at the Winter Youth Olympics.

Short track speed skating

See also
Malaysia at the 2020 Summer Olympics

References

2020 in Malaysian sport
Nations at the 2020 Winter Youth Olympics
Malaysia at the Youth Olympics